John Michael Hessel (born December 6, 1942) is a retired American luger. He competed at the 1964 and 1968 Winter Olympics and placed 22nd and 30th, respectively.

Hessel was born to a doctor, and grew up in Eugene, Oregon. He attended Menlo High School, University of Oregon, UC Berkeley and Oregon State University. At the 1964 Olympics, he was arrested for a brawl with local police, but was later acquitted. After retiring from competitions Hessel became a commercial fisherman and then a melon farmer.

References

External links
 

1942 births
Living people
American male lugers
Olympic lugers of the United States
Lugers at the 1964 Winter Olympics
Lugers at the 1968 Winter Olympics
Sportspeople from Portland, Oregon